The I.O.O.F. Building is an Independent Order of Odd Fellows building located in Woodland, Yolo County, Northern California.

History
The building was built in 1905 in the Mission Revival style, making it the first prominent building in Woodland to use the style. It originally served as a store and a business college in addition to an Odd Fellows hall. The ground floor of the building has housed businesses, including the offices of the local telephone company, and various county offices; the second floor served as the Odd Fellows' social hall, and the third floor was used for their meetings. The Odd Fellows Lodge in Woodland formed in 1863 and had 207 members and two associated chapters of the Rebekahs at the time its building was constructed.

The Woodland I.O.O.F. Building was listed on the National Register of Historic Places in 1982.

References

Odd Fellows buildings in California
Buildings and structures in Woodland, California
Clubhouses on the National Register of Historic Places in California
Buildings and structures completed in 1905
Mission Revival architecture in California
National Register of Historic Places in Yolo County, California
1905 establishments in California